Chela is a volcano in Chile that was active between 3.75±0.5 and 4.11±0.25 million years ago. It is constructed on top of the 5.4±0.3 million years old rhyolitic Carcote ignimbrite. Its eruption products are mafic andesites. The volcano was degraded by glaciation but radial ridges and red-gray rocks as well as the uniform slopes indicate that it was a symmetric stratovolcano. The Pleistocene snow line was located at  altitude and moraines formed on the northern, western and southern flanks. Perhaps volcanically pre-formed cirques also developed.

It forms a lineament with Cerro Carcote, Cerro Palpana, Miño Volcano and Volcan Las Cuevas that is oriented north-south.

References 

Stratovolcanoes of Chile
Extinct volcanoes
Pliocene stratovolcanoes